Howard Eugene Day  (August 13, 1951 – September 23, 1982) was a Canadian comics artist best known for his work on Marvel Comics' Star Wars licensed series and Master of Kung Fu. He was considered a mentor by independent comic writer/artist Dave Sim.

Biography

Early career
Gene Day began his career with Canadian underground and independent comics, for which he published the short-lived title Out of the Depths in 1974, and collaborated with Dave Sim on Oktoberfest Comics #1 (Now and Then Publications, 1976). Day also penciled for Skywald Publications' horror comics magazines Psycho and Nightmare, starting in late 1974, as well as the science fiction-oriented Orb.

For Mike Friedrich's early independent-comics company Star Reach, Day variously wrote/drew stories in 1977 and 1978 for the namesake anthology title Star Reach and its sister magazines Imagine and Quack, the latter a talking animal comic. Other work includes "Cheating Time!", written by Mark Burbey, in Dr. Wirtham's Comix & Stories #4 (1979).

In 1977 he illustrated the Greg Stafford's fantasy wargame Nomad Gods. His continuing relationship with Stafford's company, Chaosium  would see him produce artwork for many of their products, including the cover of the first edition of the horror roleplaying game Call of Cthulhu in 1981.

From 1975 until 1980, Gene Day published, under the imprint Shadow Press, at least 23 issues - the last being #d 24/25, and there having been no #13 - of the fanzine/magazine Dark Fantasy: The Magazine Of Underground Creators for which he was also an art contributor.

Graphic novel and Marvel Comics
In 1979, Day wrote and drew an early graphic novel, Future Day (Flying Buttress Press), a hardcover collection of seven stories that he called a "graphic album". Dave Sim was the letterer. Day did illustrations for the fantasy role-playing games Arena of Khazan: A Tunnels & Trolls Solitaire Dungeon (1979) and Call of Cthulhu (1981).

Day began his several-year association with Master of Kung Fu by inking penciler Mike Zeck starting with issue #76 (May 1979). He began doing finished art over Zeck's breakdowns starting with issue #94 (Nov. 1980), and became series penciler from #102–120 (July 1981–Jan. 1983), after having split the work with Zeck on the double-sized #100. In 2010, Comics Bulletin ranked Day's work on Master of Kung-Fu sixth on its list of the "Top 10 1970s Marvels". Day inked Carmine Infantino on Marvel's Star Wars series, occasionally doing finished art over breakdowns, and penciling #68–69 (Feb.–March 1983), which take place on Boba Fett's ancestral homeworld of Mandalore. In addition, Day inked Thor and Marvel Two-in-One featuring the Thing.

Death 
Day died of a coronary crossing a street in his hometown of Gananoque, Ontario.

Legacy
From 1985 to 1986, Renegade Press published five issues of Gene Day's Black Zeppelin, an anthology series primarily featuring stories and painted covers Day completed before his death, as well new contributions by Dave Sim, Bruce Conklin, Augustine Funnell, and Charles Vess. It was edited by Gail Day and Joe Erslavas. More of his work appeared posthumously in Caliber Comics' anthology series Day Brothers Presents, which also featured the work of Day's comics-artist brothers, David Day and Dan Day.

In 2002, Sim and his Cerebus collaborator Gerhard created the Howard E. Day Prize, an annual award given to a comic creator chosen by them from the exhibitors at the Small Press and Alternative Comics Expo (SPACE) held in Columbus, Ohio. The Day Prize was awarded at SPACE through 2008. Sim explained,

In 2007, Day was inducted into the Joe Shuster Awards' Canadian Comic Book Creator Hall of Fame. Two years later, with the consent of Day's brothers, the Joe Shuster Awards founded the Gene Day Award for Canadian Self-Publishing, which honors Canadian comic book creators who self-published their work during the previous calendar year. The first Day Award was presented on September 26, 2009 by David Day and James Waley to Jesse Jacobs for his self-published mini-comic Blue Winter, Shapes in the Snow.

Future Day
Day's work in his 1979, graphic novel-like story collection:
 "Gifts of Silver Splendor" (6 p.)
 "Hive" (6 p.)
 "Days of Future Past" (6 p.)
 "Gauntlet" (6 p.)
 "Paper Dragon" (5 p.)
 "War Games" (10 p.)
 "Black Legion" (text story, 7 p.)

Bibliography

Aardvark-Vanaheim
 Swords of Cerebus #3 (1981)

DC Comics
 Tales of the New Teen Titans #3 (1982)

Marvel Comics

 The Amazing Spider-Man #206 (1980) 
 Avengers #181, 201 (1979–1980) 
 Bizarre Adventures #30 (1982) 
 Black Panther #13–15 (1979) 
 Epic Illustrated #32 (writer) (1985) 
 Further Adventures of Indiana Jones #3 (1983) 
 Marvel Premiere #51–52 (Black Panther), #54 (Caleb Hammer) (1979–1980) 
 Marvel Spotlight vol. 2 #3 (Captain Marvel) (1979) 
 Marvel Team-Up #80 (1979) 
 Marvel Two-in-One #49, 56–58, 60–71, Annual #6 (1979–1981) 
 Master of Kung Fu #76–77, 79–111, 114–118, 120 (1979–1983) 
 Savage Sword of Conan #68–69, 74, 102–104, 106 (1981–1984)
 Star Trek #14, 16 (1981)
 Star Wars #18, 21, 25, 28, 30, 33, 35–37, 45, 47, 68–69 (1978–1983) 
 Thor #300, 310–315 (1980–1982)

Renegade Press
 Gene Day's Black Zeppelin #1–5 (1985–1986)

Star Reach
 Star Reach #6, 8–9, 11, 15 (1976–1978)

References

Further reading
 Entry in The Who's Who of American Comic Books 1977 Yearbook and 1978 Yearbook, by Jerry Bails

External links
 "Day, Gene" at the Michigan State University Libraries Special Collections Division: Reading Room Index to the Comic Art Collection, "Day" to "Day Zeke"
 Gene Day at Mike's Amazing World of Comics
 Gene Day at the Unofficial Handbook of Marvel Comics Creators
 Cerebus Checklist: Other Dave Sim & Gerhard Stuff
   

 

1951 births
1982 deaths
20th-century Canadian artists
Canadian comics artists
Comics inkers
Joe Shuster Award winners
Marvel Comics people
Role-playing game artists
Underground cartoonists